Michael Hastings Jay, Baron Jay of Ewelme,  (born 19 June 1946) is a British politician and former diplomat. He sits as a Crossbench member of the House of Lords, and previously served as Ambassador to France and Permanent Under Secretary at the Foreign and Commonwealth Office.

Education
Jay was born in Hampshire and educated at Winchester College, Magdalen College, Oxford (at which he read Philosophy, Politics and Economics), of which he is an honorary fellow, and the University of London's School of Oriental and African Studies (SOAS). He served as a volunteer teacher in Zambia.

Diplomatic career

Jay joined the Ministry of Overseas Development in 1969, serving in London, Washington (at the World Bank) in 1973 and as First Secretary (Development) at the British High Commission, New Delhi, in 1978. He transferred to the Foreign and Commonwealth Office in 1981, serving as Private Secretary to the Permanent Under-Secretary of State. As Counsellor he served in the European Secretariat of the Cabinet Office from 1985 to 1987. He was posted as Counsellor in the Paris Embassy from 1987 to 1990, returning to the FCO as Director for European Affairs until 1994. He was appointed Director General for European and Economic Affairs 1994–96, following which he became a Senior Associate Member of St Antony's College, Oxford.

From July 1996 to September 2001 he was British Ambassador to France. During this tenure, he was the first British official to speak publicly on the death of Diana, Princess of Wales in August 1997. In July 2001, he was appointed Permanent Under-Secretary of State for Foreign Affairs and thus Head of the Diplomatic Service, a post he took up on 14 January 2002.

In 2005 and 2006, Jay served as the Prime Minister's Personal Representative (Sherpa) for the G8 summits at Gleneagles and St Petersburg in addition to his PUS duties.

He was appointed a Companion of the Order of St Michael & St George in the 1992 Birthday Honours, promoted to Knight Commander in the 1997 New Year Honours and made a Knight Grand Cross in the 2006 Birthday Honours.

Post retirement
Upon his retirement from HM's Diplomatic Service on 27 July 2006, he was recommended for a Life peerage, and this was gazetted as Baron Jay of Ewelme, of Ewelme in the County of Oxfordshire, on 18 September 2006.

Lord Jay was the Chair of Merlin, the British health and medical aid agency, from 2007 until 2013. He has been a non-executive director of Associated British Foods (2006-), Credit Agricole (2007-2011), EDF (2009-), Candover PLC (2008-)and Valeo SA (2007-). He is a Trustee of the Thomson Reuters Founders share company (2013-), and Chairman of the Advisory Council of the British Library (2011 -).

He was Chairman of the House of Lords Appointments Commission from 2008 until 2013). he has served on sub-committees C, E and F of the House of Lords Select Committee on European Union affairs.

Family

Jay married Sylvia Mylroie in 1975. In 2005, Lady Jay was appointed Vice-Chairman of L'Oreal UK & Ireland, then Chairman from 2011 to 2013. She has been a non-executive director on the board of Alcatel-Lucent, and is non-executive director of St-Gobain, Lazard and Casino Group. 

She is Chairman of the Pilgrim Trust and has been a trustee of the Prison Reform Trust and Entente Cordiale Scholarship Scheme. 

In 2019, she was appointed as High Sheriff of Oxfordshire.

Arms

References

External links
Announcement of life peerage

Offices held

1946 births
Living people
People educated at Winchester College
Alumni of Magdalen College, Oxford
Fellows of Magdalen College, Oxford
Alumni of SOAS University of London
Jay of Ewelme, Michael Jay, Baron
Ambassadors of the United Kingdom to France
Jay of Ewelme, Michael Jay, Baron
Jay of Ewelme, Michael Jay, Baron
Permanent Under-Secretaries of State for Foreign Affairs
Civil servants in the Ministry of Overseas Development
Civil servants in the Cabinet Office
Members of HM Diplomatic Service
20th-century British diplomats
Life peers created by Elizabeth II